Number 6 Squadron of the Royal Air Force operates the Eurofighter Typhoon FGR.4 at RAF Lossiemouth.
It was previously equipped with the SEPECAT Jaguar GR.3 in the close air support and tactical reconnaissance roles, and was posted to RAF Coltishall, Norfolk until April 2006, moving to RAF Coningsby until disbanding for the first time in its history on 31 May 2007.  The squadron officially reformed as a Typhoon squadron on 6 September 2010. No. 6 Squadron is unique in having two Royal standards, having been awarded its second one by King Abdullah I of Jordan in October 1950 due to its long period of service in the Middle East.

History

First World War

The squadron was formed on 31 January 1914, at Farnborough as No. 6 Squadron, Royal Flying Corps.  Its first squadron commander was Major John Becke. The squadron had an initial aircraft inventory of two Royal Aircraft Factory B.E.2s and two Farmans, with the squadron also initially incorporating a flight operating man-lifting kite. The squadron, equipped with a mixture of B.E.2s, Royal Aircraft Factory B.E.8s and Farmans crossed the English Channel in October 1914 to support IV Corps in its attempt to prevent the Germans from capturing Antwerp. In November, the squadron joined the newly formed 2nd Wing of the RFC, with the role of supporting the Second and Third Corps.

On 25 July 1915, Captain Lanoe Hawker attacked three German aircraft in succession. The first aerial victory for Hawker that day occurred after he emptied a complete drum of bullets from his aircraft's single Lewis machine gun into a German aircraft which went spinning down. The second victory saw a German aircraft driven to the ground damaged, and the third saw a German aircraft – an Albatros C.I of FFA 3 – burst into flames and crash. For this feat he was awarded the Victoria Cross.

Inter-war years

Following the Armistice, the squadron transferred to Iraq, arriving in July 1919.  Operating in the army co-operation role in Northern Iraq, it was equipped with Bristol Fighters. It was later re-equipped with Fairey Gordons and assumed the bomber role, Hawker Harts replacing these in 1935.

Second World War

The squadron relocated to Palestine in 1938, reverting to the army co-operation role with Hawker Hardys, adding Gloster Gauntlets and Westland Lysanders. When hostilities with Italy broke out in June 1940, the squadron deployed one flight of aircraft to Egypt to work with the army, with the remainder of the squadron remained in Palestine. Between September 1940 and September 1943 the squadron saw action in the tank-busting, 40 mm cannon-firing Hawker Hurricane Mk. IID, over the Western Desert.

In the spring of 1944, the squadron moved to a coastal field south-east of Termoli, Italy. The squadron flew Hurricane Mk.IVs equipped with rocket projectiles.  Moored Axis ships were attacked at Yugoslav harbours and the Dalmatian islands. They were strongly defended by anti-aircraft gunners on Siebel ferries with their multiple guns, as the ships were being used to supply the German forces. Squadron detachments were also made to Bastia in Corsica, Araxos near Patras in Greece, Brindisi, and near Ancona. A fixed 44-gallon extra petrol tank under the port wing increased the Hurricanes' duration to almost three hours at  cruising speed.  The airfield on Vis (island) was extensively used as an advanced base from May 1944 to February 1945, usually to top up tanks before each armed reconnaissance.

Post-Second World War/Cold War 
In July 1945, the squadron moved to Palestine where it cooperated with the police, patrolling the Kirkuk-to-Haifa oil pipeline to prevent terrorist attacks. The squadron remained in the Middle East until 1969. During this period, the squadron went from being equipped with Hurricanes (and for a brief period four Spitfires due to a lack of available Hurricanes) to Hawker Tempest Mk. VIs and subsequently de Havilland Vampire FB.5s.

In January 1950, the squadron moved to RAF Habbaniya in Iraq with many moves back and forth between RAF Habbaniya and RAF Shaibah in Iraq, RAF Abu Sueir and RAF Deversoir in the Suez Canal Zone, RAF Nicosia in Cyprus, RAF Mafraq and RAF Amman in the Hashemite Kingdom of Jordan and detachments throughout the Middle East. While visiting Amman on 15 October 1950, No. 6 Squadron was awarded a Royal Standard by King Abdullah I of Jordan in recognition of the squadron's service in the Middle East since 1919. The squadron continued its close relationship with Jordan throughout the early 1950s, with both King Talal and King Hussein. During this period, it continued to operate Vampires FB.5s and FB.9s(1952) and two twin-seat Gloster Meteor T.7s until it re-equipped with de Havilland Venom FB.1 in February 1954 and the Venom FB.4 in June 1955.

On 6 April 1956, after a brief period back at RAF Habbaniya in Iraq the squadron returned to Cyprus and operated from RAF Akrotiri. From there it attacked Egyptian airfields during the Suez Crisis. In 1957, the squadron again re-equipped, this time with English Electric Canberras, which it continued to operate from Akrotiri until 1969.

Having been located outside of the UK for 50 years, the squadron returned in 1969 and was the first to receive the Phantom FGR.2 at RAF Coningsby the same year, before re-equipping with the Jaguar GR.1 and T.2 at RAF Lossiemouth in 1974. The squadron then moved to RAF Coltishall, being declared operational in the tactical nuclear role with twelve aircraft and eight WE.177 nuclear bombs until 1994, when the squadron's nuclear role was terminated and the weapons withdrawn.

Post-Cold War
The squadron continued at RAF Coltishall in its non-nuclear role until Coltishall closed on 1 April 2006, and the squadron moved to RAF Coningsby. The squadron's aircraft were deployed to the Gulf as part of Operation Granby (Gulf War), for which it received battle honours, and later as part of the Northern No-Fly-Zone. The squadron deployed to Italy for operations over Bosnia from 1993.

The squadron was the last to fly the SEPECAT Jaguar, and was disbanded on 31 May 2007. The Jaguar's intended replacement in RAF service was the Eurofighter Typhoon. The RAF announced that No. 6 Squadron was to be the fourth operational front-line squadron equipped with the Typhoon and the first with Tranche 2 aircraft, initially scheduled to reform in 2008 at RAF Leuchars in Fife. However, this was delayed until 2010, with the squadron reforming at RAF Leuchars on 6 September 2010, when a closed standing-up ceremony was performed to mark the squadron's reforming, including the arrival of the new Typhoon aircraft in 6 Squadron colours from RAF Coningsby. It has taken over the role of Quick Reaction Alert for the north of the United Kingdom from No. 111 Squadron RAF, the RAF's last Panavia Tornado F.3 squadron, in March 2011. In November 2011 four Typhoons from No. 6 Squadron flew to RMAF Butterworth to participate in aerial wargames for the 40th anniversary of the Five Power Defence Arrangements. In June 2014, the squadron began to move to its new home in RAF Lossiemouth.

The squadron participated in the 2018 missile strikes against Syria during the Syrian Civil War.

In March 2020, the squadron was awarded the right to emblazon a battle honour on its squadron standard, recognising its role in Bosnia during 1995.

Aircraft operated

Aircraft operated included:

 Farman MF.7 "Long Horn" and MF.11 "Short Horn" (1914)
 Royal Aircraft Factory B.E.2 variants (1914)
 Royal Aircraft Factory R.E.8 (1918)
 Bristol Scout (1915)
 Bristol F2B "Brisfit" (to 1931)
 Fairey Gordon
 Gloster Gauntlet
 Hawker Hart (1935)
 Hawker Demon (1935)
 Hawker Hardy (1938)
 Westland Lysander
 Gloster Gladiator
 Hawker Hurricane (1941)
 Hawker Hurricane IID — Famous "Tankbusting" variant (1942–1944)
 Hawker Hurricane IV — Ground Attack variant (1944–1946)
 Bristol Blenheim
 Supermarine Spitfire (1946)
 Hawker Tempest (1946–1949)
 de Havilland Vampire (1949)
 de Havilland Venom FB.4
 English Electric Canberra B.2, B.15, B.16 (1957–1969)
 McDonnell Douglas F-4M Phantom FGR.2 (1969–1974)
 SEPECAT Jaguar GR.3 (1974–2007)
 Eurofighter Typhoon FGR.4 (2007 – present)

Commanding officers

See also
List of Royal Air Force aircraft squadrons

References

Notes

Bibliography

 Halley, James J. The Squadrons of the Royal Air Force & Commonwealth, 1918-1988. Tonbridge, Kent, UK: Air-Britain (Historians) Ltd., 1988. .
 Jefford, Wing Commander C.G. RAF Squadrons, a Comprehensive Record of the Movement and Equipment of all RAF Squadrons and their Antecedents since 1912. Shrewsbury: Airlife Publishing, 2001. .
 Lewis, Peter. Squadron Histories: R.F.C, R.N.A.S and R.A.F., 1912-59. London: Putnam, 1959.
 Moyes, Philip J.R. Bomber Squadrons of the RAF and their Aircraft. London: Macdonald and Jane's (Publishers) Ltd., 1964 (new edition 1976). .
 
 Rawlings, John D.R. Coastal, Support and Special Squadrons of the RAF and their Aircraft. London: Jane's Publishing Company Ltd., 1982. .
 Rawlings, John D.R. Fighter Squadrons of the RAF and their Aircraft. London: Macdonald and Jane's (Publishers) Ltd., 1969 (new edition 1976, reprinted 1978). .

External links

 6 Squadron
 RAF 6 Squadron Association
 Air of Authority: A History of RAF organisation

Military units and formations established in 1914
006 Squadron
No. 6 Sq
006 Squadron
1914 establishments in the United Kingdom
Military units and formations in Mandatory Palestine in World War II